Family Affairs was a BBC television discussion programme broadcast from 1956.

References

1956 British television series debuts
1950s British television series
1960s British television series
BBC television documentaries